In United States aviation, a National Security Area (NSA) is a designated airspace through which flight is discouraged for reasons of national security.

Flight through NSAs is not prohibited and no special advance clearance or authorization need be obtained to enter them.  However, pilots of aircraft are strongly encouraged to either stay clear of NSAs or obtain prior authorization to pass through them in order to reassure the controlling agency that no threat to national security exists.

NSAs are a compromise between normal airspace and restricted or prohibited airspace.  NSAs can be temporarily converted into restricted airspace by NOTAMs.

On VFR sectional charts, NSAs are delimited by a heavy dashed magenta border and a special notation.

When not referring to aviation, a National Security Area is a designated area temporarily placed under the command of the National Nuclear Security Administration. It is designed to safeguard classified, sensitive, or restricted information, equipment or materials relevant to the NNSA mission.

References

See also
Special-use airspace
Restricted airspace
Prohibited airspace

Air traffic control in the United States
Nuclear secrecy
United States government secrecy
Nuclear safety and security